Migorybia miranda is a species of beetle in the family Cerambycidae, the only species in the genus Migorybia.

References

Piezocerini
Monotypic beetle genera